Everything Black is a song by American electronica producer Armond Arabshahi, better known by his stage name Unlike Pluto, and features Philadelphia-based vocalist Mike Taylor. The song was released on Canadian record label Monstercat on March 10, 2017 and is Arabshashi's fifth release on the label.

Background 
Uproxx describes the song as "jazzy and dark," with "a slinky, almost joyful groove." The song incorporates elements of R&B, jazz, funk, and soul.

Reception 
Billboard described Mike Taylor's vocal performance as a comparison to Mick Jagger of The Rolling Stones. Noiseporn described the song as "everything a modern, all-black wearing, club crawling millennial like myself could ask for." EDM.com proclaimed Taylor's vocals as "superb".

Tour 
On release, Arabshahi announced the Everything Black Tour, which covered much of North America. The tour began on March 31 in Ottawa.

Certifications

References 

2017 songs
2017 singles
Electronic songs
Monstercat singles